Action learning is an approach to problem solving involving taking action and reflecting upon the results. This helps improve the problem-solving process as well as simplify the solutions developed by the team. The theory of action learning and its epistemological position were originally developed by Reg Revans, who applied the method to support organizational and business development initiatives and improve on problem solving efforts.

Action learning is effective in developing a number of individual leadership and team problem-solving skills, and it became a component in corporate and organizational leadership development programs. This strategy is different from the "one size fits all" curriculum that is characteristic of many training and development programs. Confucius once said, "I hear and I forget; I see and I remember; I do and I understand," and action learning is a cycle of doing and reflecting.

Overview
The action learning process includes:

 A real problem that is important, critical, and usually complex,
 A diverse problem-solving team or "set",
 A process that promotes curiosity, inquiry, and reflection,
 A requirement that talk be converted into action and, ultimately, a solution, and
 A commitment to learning.

In most forms of action learning, a coach is included and responsible for promoting and facilitating learning, as well as encouraging the team to be self-managing.

Revans' formula
Reginald Revans is the originator of action learning. Revans' formative influences included his experience training as a physicist at the University of Cambridge. In his encounters with this talented group of scientists—several went on to win Nobel prizes—he noted the importance of each scientist describing their own ignorance, sharing experiences, and communally reflecting to learn. He used these experiences to further develop the method in the 1940s while working for the Coal Board in United Kingdom. Here, he encouraged managers to meet together in small groups, to share their experiences and ask each other questions about what they saw and heard. The approach increased productivity by over 30%. Later on, in hospitals, he concluded that the conventional instructional methods were largely ineffective. People had to be aware of their lack of relevant knowledge and be prepared to explore the area of their ignorance with suitable questions and help from other people in similar positions.

Revans makes this more precise in the opening chapter of his book which describes the formula:

where L is learning, P is programmed knowledge and Q is questioning to create insight into what people see, hear or feel.

Q uses :
 "closed" questions:
 who?
 what?
 "objective" questions:
 how much or how many?
 "relative" questions:
 where
 when
 "open" questions
 why?
 how?

Although Q is the cornerstone of the method, the more relaxed formulation has enabled action learning to become widely accepted in many countries all over the world. In Revans' book, there are examples from the United States, Canada, Latin America, the Middle East, Africa, and Asia-Pacific.

International Management Centres, the action learning professional association where Revans was the  inaugural president, have proposed an extension to this formula with the addition of R for "reflection". This has also been proposed by Michael Marquardt:

In this expanded equation, R refers to reflection. This additional element emphasizes the point that "great questions" should evoke thoughtful reflections while considering the current problem, the desired goal, designing strategies, developing action or implementation plans, or executing action steps that are components of the implementation plan.

Waddill and Marquardt (2003) demonstrate the link between adult learning theory and Marquardt's action learning approach in their article entitled "Adult Learning Orientations and Action Learning".

Action-based learning questions
Action-based learning questions are questions that are based on the approach of action learning where one solves real-life problems that involve taking action and reflecting upon the results. There are two types of questions: closed questions and open questions. Closed questions involve a technique which does not allow the respondents to develop their response, they can just say 'Yes' or 'No'. Open questions allow the respondents to expand or explore in their response.

One of the keys to effective action learning is asking the 'right question'. When asked to the right people at the right time, these questions result in obtaining the necessary information. The action learning process, which primarily uses a questioning approach, can be more helpful than offering advice because it assumes that each person has the capacity to find their own answers.

Normally, the purpose of asking a question is to obtain information. However, in action Learning, the purpose is to help someone else to do one or more of the following:

Think more deeply
Explore new options and perspectives
Reflect in order to make better choices and decisions

Types of questions

Closed questions 

Closed questions involve a technique which does not allow the respondents to develop their response. It can do so by limiting respondents with a strict, limited list of answer choices. Answers are mostly monosyllabic words or short phrases. For example, some closed questions can only be answered by a "Yes" or "No".

Closed questions should not be interpreted as simple questions. They can be of varying levels of difficulty, and may make the respondent think before answering. Take this phrase for example: "When two quantities are dependent on each other, does an increase in one always leads to an increase in the other?".

Usage of closed questions:

 To give facts
 To help keep control of the conversation with the questioner
 To open up a conversation

Open questions 

Open questions allow the respondent to expand or explore in their response, and do not have a single correct response. This gives the respondent the freedom to discover new ideas, consider different possibilities, and decide on the course of action which is right for them.

Open-ended questions are not always long—they may be short as well as open-ended. Shorter questions often have equal or greater impact than longer ones. When asking shorter questions, it is easier to be perceived as abrupt or even rude. When questioning an Action Learning set, it is important to be aware of one's tone and language. The goal is usually to ask challenging questions, or to challenge the respondent's perspective.

Usage of open questions:

 To encourage discussion of opinion and feelings.
 To think and reflect
 To give control of the conversation to the respondent
 To expand upon a closed question
 To aid in the realization of the depth of a situation
 To help to learn more about an individual

Use in organizations
Today, action learning is practiced by a wide community of businesses, governments, non-profits, and educational institutions.

Writers on the subject have included Mike Pedler, Alan Mumford and Richard Hale in the United Kingdom & Australia, Yury Boshyk in Canada, Garry Luxmore in Australia. Ng Choon Seng in Singapore, Ira Cohen and Kevin Hao in China, and Michael Marquardt, Skipton Leonard, Arthur Freedman, Robert Kramer, and Joe Raelin, and Verna Willis (a pioneer in action learning and co-author with Robert L. Dilworth, as well as an award recipient with the Annual Global Forum on Action Learning in the United States.

Action learning is applied by using the action learning question method (Hale) to support organizational development (OD) capability development across central government in the UK Civil Service supported by OD specialists Mayvin. As such, this is combining action learning with organizational development as reported at the 2014 Ashridge Action Learning Conference and Action Learning: Research and Practice, October, 2014.

An action learning approach has been recognized as a valuable means of supporting the continuing professional development of professionals in emerging professions. The action learning question approach has been applied with, for instance the emerging professional field of global outsourcing as reported by Hale ('Actual Professional Development', Training Journal, 2012). This supports the idea that powerful learning can occur at the boundaries of organizations as proposed by Wenger in his work on 'communities of practice'.

Organizations may also use action learning in the virtual environment. This is a cost-effective solution that enables the widespread use of action learning at all levels of an organization. Action e-Learning (AEL), as defined and implemented by Waddill, provides a viable alternative for organizations interested in adapting the action learning process for online delivery with groups where the members are not co-located.

ARL, MiL and WIAL models
As with other educational processes, practitioners have built on Revans' pioneering work and have adapted some tenets to accommodate their needs. One such branch of action learning is Action Reflection Learning (ARL), which originated in Sweden among educators and consultants under the guidance of Lennart Rohlin of the MiL Institute in the 1970s. With the so-called "MiL model", ARL gained momentum with the work of LIM, Leadership in International Management, under the leadership of Ernie Turner in the USA. The WIAL (World Institute for Action Learning) Model was developed by Michael Marquardt, Skipton Leonard, Bea Carson and Arthur Freedman.

The main differences between Revans' approach to action learning and the 'MiL Model' in the '80s are :
 the role of a project team advisor (later called Learning Coach), which Revans had reservations about;
 the use of team projects rather than individual challenges;
 the duration of the sessions, which is more flexible in ARL designs.

The MiL model evolved organically as practitioners responded to diverse needs and restrictions. In an experiential learning mode, MiL practitioners varied the number and duration of the sessions, the type of project selected, the role of the Learning Coach and the style of his/her interventions.

ARL evolved organically through the choices and savvy intuitions of practitioners, who informally exchanged their experiences with each other. It became a somewhat shared practice, which incorporated elements of design and intervention that the practitioners adopted because of their efficacy. In 2004, Isabel Rimanoczy researched and codified the ARL methodology, identifying 16 elements and 10 underlying principles.

The WIAL model incorporates six elements: 
 problem or challenge
 group of 4–8 members
 reflective inquiry
 development and implementation of strategies and actions
 individual, group and organizational learning
 an action learning coach. 
The model starts with 2 simple ground rules that ensure that statements follow and are related to questions and provide the authority for the coach to promote learning. Team members may develop additional ground rules, norms, and roles as they deem necessary or advantageous. Addressing Revans' concern that a coach's over-involvement in the problem-solving process will engender dependency, WIAL coaches only ask questions that encourage team members to reflect on the team's behavior (what is working, can be improved, or done differently) in efforts to improve learning and, ultimately, performance.

"Unlearning" as a prerequisite for "learning"
Robert Kramer pioneered the use of action learning for officials in the U.S. government, and at the European Commission in Brussels and Luxembourg. He also introduced action learning to scientists at the European Environment Agency in Copenhagen, to officials of the Estonian government at the State Chancellery (Prime Minister's Office) in Tallinn, Estonia, and to students of communication and media studies at Corvinus University of Budapest.

The process of learning more creative ways of thinking, feeling, and being is achieved in action learning by reflecting on what is working now and as well as on actions that can be improved. Action learning is consistent with the principles of positive psychology and appreciative inquiry by encouraging team/set members to build on strengths and learn from life's challenges. In action learning, there is no need to forget what has worked in the past. However, reflecting on what has not worked helps team/set members unlearn what doesn't work and invent/learn better ways of acting and moving forward. This way, team/set members are able to keep what has worked in the past, while also finding new and improved ways to increase productivity, in areas that may need improvement.

Unlike other writers in the field of action learning, Kramer applies the theory of art, creativity and "unlearning" of the psychologist Otto Rank to his practice of action learning. Rank was the first to see therapy as a learning and unlearning experience. The therapeutic relationship allows the patient to: (1) learn more creative ways of thinking, feeling and being in the here-and-now; and (2) unlearn self-destructive ways of thinking, feeling and being in the here-and-now. Patterns of self-destruction ("neurosis") represent a failure of creativity, not, as Freud assumed, a retreat from sexuality.

In action learning questions allow group members to "step out of the frame of the prevailing ideology", as Otto Rank wrote in Art and Artist, reflect on their assumptions and beliefs, and reframe their choices. The process of "stepping out" of a frame, out of a form of knowing—a prevailing ideology—is analogous to the work of artists as they struggle to give birth to fresh ways of seeing the world, perspectives that allow them to see aspects of the world that no artists, including themselves, have ever seen before.

The most creative artists, such as Rembrandt, Michelangelo and Leonardo, know how to separate even from their own greatest public successes, from earlier artistic incarnations of themselves. Their "greatness consists precisely in this reaching out beyond themselves, beyond the ideology which they have themselves fostered", according to Art and Artist. Through the lens of Otto Rank's work on understanding art and artists, action learning can be seen as the never-completed process of learning how to "step out of the frame" of the ruling mindset, whether one's own or the culture's—in other words, of learning how to unlearn.

Comparing the process of unlearning to the "breaking out" process of birth, Otto Rank was the first psychologist to suggest that a continual capacity to separate from "internal mental objects"—from internalized institutions, beliefs and assumptions; from the restrictions of culture, social conformity and received wisdom—is the sine qua non for lifelong creativity.

Unlearning necessarily involves separation from one's self-concept, as it has been culturally conditioned to conform to familial, group, occupational or organizational allegiances. According to Rank, unlearning or breaking out of our shell from the inside is "a separation [that] is so hard, not only because it involves persons and ideas that one reveres, but because the victory is always, at bottom, and in some form, won over a part of one's ego".

In the organizational context, learning how to unlearn is vital because what we assume to be true has merged into our identity. We refer to the identity of an individual as a "mindset". We refer to the identity of an organizational group as a "culture". Action learners learn how to question, probe and separate from, both kinds of identity—i.e., their "individual" selves and their "social" selves. By opening themselves to critical inquiry, they begin to learn how to emancipate themselves from what they "know"—they learn how to unlearn.

There is also an emerging, radical approach to unlearning in the areas of critical action learning (CAR). According to Pedler and Hsu, Chokr's concept of unlearning has an important implication for critical action learning because it questions the predominant cultural tendency that sees conventional teaching as an unquestionable good. Pedler and Hsu further connect the idea of unlearning to some ancient forms of wisdom such as Taoism.

Role of facilitator, coach and questions
An ongoing challenge of action learning has been to take productive action as well as to take the time necessary to capture the learning that result from reflecting on the results of taking action. Usually, the urgency of the problem or task decreases or eliminates the reflective time necessary for learning. As a consequence, more and more organizations have recognized the critical importance of an action learning coach or facilitator in the process, someone who has the authority and responsibility of creating time and space for the group to learn at the individual, group and organizational level.

There is controversy, however, about the need for an action learning coach. Reg Revans was sceptical about the use of learning coaches and, in general, of interventionist approaches. He believed the action learning set or group could practice action learning on its own. He also had a major concern that too much process facilitation would lead a group to become dependent on a coach or facilitator. Nevertheless, later in his development of the action learning method, Revans experimented with including a role that he described as a "supernumerary" that had many similarities to that of a facilitator or coach. Revans, like many other action learning practitioners, noted that without someone dedicated to managing basic process norms as well as championing individual, team, and organizational learning, action learning often devolved into much action without much learning.

Pedler distills Revans' thinking about the key role of the action learning facilitator as follows:

(i) The initiator or "accoucheur": "No organisation is likely to embrace action learning unless there is some person within it ready to fight on its behalf. ......This useful intermediary we may call the accoucheur—the managerial midwife who sees that their organisation gives birth to a new idea... ".

(ii) The set facilitator or "combiner":
"there may be a need when it (the set) is first formed for some supernumerary ...
brought into speed the integration of the set ...." but "Such a combiner ....... must contrive that it (the set) achieves independence of them at the earliest possible moment...".

(iii) The facilitator of organizational learning or the "learning community" organiser:
"The most precious asset of any organization is the one most readily overlooked: its capacity to build upon its lived experience, to learn from its challenges and to turn in a better performance by inviting all and sundry to work out for themselves what that performance ought to be."

Hale suggested that the facilitator role developed by Revans be incorporated into any standards for action learning facilitation accreditation. Hale also suggests the action learning facilitator role includes the functions of mobiliser, learning set adviser, and learning catalyst. To increase the reflective, learning aspect of action learning, many groups now adopt the practice or norm of focusing on questions rather than statements while working on the problem and developing strategies and actions. Questions focus discussion and encourage the group to listen, to become a cohesive team more quickly, and to generate creative, out-of-the-box thinking.

Self-managed action learning is a variant of action learning that dispenses with the need for a facilitator of the action learning set. Shurville and Rospigliosi have explored using virtual action learning to promote self-management by the team. Deborah Waddill has developed guidelines for virtual action learning teams, what she calls action e-learning.

There are a number of problems, however, with pure self-managed teams (i.e., with no coach). Wellins, Byham, & Wilson have noted that self-managing teams (such as task forces) seldom take the time to reflect on what they are doing or make efforts to identify key lessons learned from the process. Without reflection, team members are likely to import organizational or sub-unit cultural norms and familiar problem solving practices into the problem-solving process without explicitly testing their validity and utility. Team members employ assumptions, mental models, and beliefs about methods or processes that are seldom openly challenged, much less tested. As a result, teams often apply traditional problem solving methods to non-traditional, urgent, critical, and discontinuous problems. In addition, team members often "leap" from the initial problem statement to some form of brainstorming that they assume will produce a viable solution. These suggested solutions typically provoke objections, doubts, concerns, or reservations from other team members who advocate their own preferred solutions. The conflicts that ensue are generally both unproductive and time-consuming. As a result, self-managed teams, tend to split or fragment rather than develop and evolve into a cohesive, high-performing team.

Because of these typical characteristics of self-managing teams, many theorists and practitioners have argued that real and effective self-management in action learning requires coaches with the authority to intervene whenever they perceive an opportunity to promote learning or improve team performance. Without this team role, there is no assurance that the team will make the time needed for the periodic, systemic, and strategic inquiry and reflection that is necessary for effective individual, team, and organizational learning.

Events, forums and conferences
A number of organizations sponsor events focusing on the implementation and improvement of action learning. These include The Journal of Action Learning: Research & Practice, the World Institute of Action Learning Global Forum, International Foundation for Action Learning events, the Global Forum on Executive Development and Business Driven Action Learning, and the Action Learning, Action Research Association World Congress. LinkedIn interest groups devoted to action learning include WIAL Network, Action Learning Forum, International Foundation for Action Learning, Global Forum on Business Driven Action Learning and Executive Development, Learning Thru Action, and Action Research and Learning in Organizations.

See also
 Action research
 Action teaching
 
 Experiential learning
 Inquiry-based learning
 Large-group capacitation
 Learning cycle

Notes

Further reading

 Boshyk, Yury, and Dilworth, Robert L. 2010. Action Learning and its Applications. Basingstoke, UK: Macmillan.
 Boshyk, Yury. 2000. Business Driven Action Learning: Global Best Practices. Basingstoke, UK: Macmillan.
 Boshyk, Yury. 2002. Action Learning Worldwide: Experiences of Leadership and Organizational Development. Basingstoke, UK: Macmillan.
 Carrington, L. House Proud: Action Learning is Paying Dividends at Building Firm, People Management, 5 December 2002, pp 36–38.
 Chambers, A. and Hale, R. 2007. Keep Walking: Leadership Learning in Action, MX Publishing; 2nd edition (9 November 2009), UK.
 Collingham, B., Critten, P., Garnett, J. and Hale, R. (2007) A Partnership Approach to Developing and Accrediting Work Based Learning – Creating Successful Work Based Learning – Meeting the Skills Challenge for Performance Improvement, Inaugural Conference, British Institute for Learning and Development, Royal Society of Medicine, London 17 May 2007.
 Crainer, Stuart. 1999. The 75 Greatest Management Decisions Ever Made. New York: AMACOM Publishing
 Critten, P. & Hale, R. (2006) 'From Work Based/ Action learning to Action Research – Towards a Methodology for the Worker/ Practitioner researcher' The Work-based Learning Network of the Universities Association for Life-Long learning Annual Conference: 'Work Based Projects: The Worker as Researcher 24–25 April 2006 University of Northampton.
 Dilworth, R. L., and Willis, V. 2003. Action Learning: Images and Pathways.
 Freedman, A.M. & Leonard, H.S. 2013. Leading organizational change using action learning: What leadersh should know before committing to a consulting contract. Reston, VA: Learning Thru Action Press.
 Kozubska, J & MacKenzie, B 2012. Differences and impact through action learning, Action Learning Research & Practice, 9 2, 1450164.
 Leonard, H.S. & Freedman, A.M. 2013. Great solutions through action learning: success every time. Reston, VA: Learning Thru Action Press.
 McGill & N. Beech (Eds) Reflective learning in practice, Aldershot, Gower.
 Hale, Richard. 2014. Fundamentals of Action Learning, Training Journal, August, 2014, pp. 30–36.
 Hale, Richard. 2014. Fundamentals of Action Learning: Knowledge Mapping, Training Journal, September, 2014.
 Hale, Richard. 2014. Fundamentals of Action Learning: Mobilising Action Learning, Training Journal, October, 2014.
 Marquardt, M. J. 1999. Action learning in action. Palo Alto, CA:Davies-Black.
 Marquardt, M. J. 2004. Harnessing the power of action learning. T D, 58(6): 26–32.
 Marquardt, M.J. 2011. Optimizing the power of action learning. Boston: Nicholas Brealey Publishing.
 Marquardt, M.J. & Roland Yeo (2012). Breakthrough Problem Solving with Action Learning: Concepts and Cases. Stanford, CA: Stanford University Press.
 Martinsons, M.G. 1998. MBA action learning projects. Hong Kong University Press.
 O'Neil, J. and Marsick, V.J. 2007. Understanding Action Learning. NY: AMACOM Publishing
 Pedler, M., (Ed.). 1991. Action learning in practice (2nd ed.). Aldershot, UK: Gower.
 Pedler, M. 1996. Action learning for managers. London: Lemos and Crane.
 Raelin, J. A. 1997. Action learning and action science: Are they different? Organizational Dynamics, 26(1): 21–34.
 Raelin, J. A. 2000. Work-based learning: The new frontier of management development. Reading, MA: Addison-Wesley.
 Rimanoczy, I., and Turner, E. 2008. Action Reflection Learning: solving real business problems by connecting learning with earning. US, Davies-Black Publishing.
 Rohlin, L., Turner, E. and others. 2002. Earning while Learning in Global Leadership: the Volvo MiL Partnership. Sweden, MiL Publishers AB.
 Smith, S. & Smith, L. (2017) Assessing the value of action learning for social enterprises and charities. Action Learning: Research and Practice (14)3: 230-242
 Sawchuk, P. H. 2003. Adult learning and technology in working class life. New York: Cambridge University Press.

External links

Learning methods
Educational practices
Test equipment